Langereis is a hamlet in the Dutch province of North Holland. It is located in the municipalities of Hollands Kroon and Opmeer, and lies about 7 km northeast of Heerhugowaard.

Langereis has no place name signs. It was home to 235 people in 1840.

References
 

Populated places in North Holland
Hollands Kroon
Opmeer